Raad Ghantous (born in Baghdad, Iraq) is an interior designer who was involved in the redesigning of the Cultural Center in San Clemente.

Early life 
His mother was half Lebanese and half Assyrian, of the Chaldean Catholic church. His father was an Eastern Orthodox civil engineer, he was born in Iraq. His grandfather moved to Iraq from Haifa, (then in Mandatory Palestine) because of the educational facilities available in Iraq, later on his father and the family moved to Abu Dhabi but didn't settle as they left for Kuwait, where Raad had attended high school and then he received a degree in economics at the American College of Switzerland in Leysin.

He later on sought refuge in the United States, where he decided to undertake a course in interior design and received his degree.

Career
He soon landed a job for Whimberly Allison, Tong & Go and has also worked for Hirsch-Bedner and Design 1. He has designed many projects such as a mansion in Beverly Hills, his work has proven successful and rewarding as the location of most of his projects are in exotic places such as Spain, China, Japan and the United Arab Emirates.
He soon started his own interior business, Raad Ghantous & Associates, in which he imports accessories from Morocco and Egypt to accompany his work.

He currently serves on the Design Committee in the LA Downtown Business Association.  Furthermore, Raad is a big supporter of the progressive democratic party and socialist parties.

References

External links
Featured in Coast Magazine
Featured in San Clemente Journal
Featured in insideeldercare.com

Living people
Year of birth missing (living people)
Artists from Baghdad
American people of Assyrian descent
American people of Iraqi descent
American people of Lebanese descent
American people of Palestinian descent
Iraqi businesspeople
Iraqi Eastern Catholics
Iraqi interior designers
Iraqi people of Lebanese descent
Iraqi people of Palestinian descent
Chaldean Catholics